Karen Williams may refer to

 Karen Williams (soprano), American concert and opera soprano
 Karen J. Williams (1951–2013), Chief Judge of the United States Court of Appeals for the Fourth Circuit
 Karen Lynn Williams (born 1952), American writer of children's literature
 Karen L. Williams, American diplomat
 Karen M. Williams (born 1963), American federal judge in New Jersey
 Karen Hastie Williams (1944–2021), American lawyer and company director

See also
 Karyn Williams, American Christian musician